Josef Mašín (26 August 1896 – 30 June 1942) was an army officer of Czechoslovakia and member of the underground resistance against the Nazis. He was the father of Josef and Ctirad Mašín.

Biography
Josef Mašín was born in Lošany near Kolín.  He was a member of the Czechoslovak Legions fighting in Russia (1916–1921) and later an officer in the Czechoslovak Army (commander of an artillery regiment). After the occupation of Czechoslovakia by Nazi Germany he, together with Josef Balabán and Václav Morávek, formed a resistance group concentrated on intelligence gathering and sabotage. 

While more resistance groups existed, this one, aptly named Tři Králové (Three Kings), is the most known among the Czech public.
Mašín was captured by the Gestapo on 13 May 1941. After being tortured, he twice attempted suicide. As part of the German retaliatory measures for the assassination of Reinhard Heydrich he was shot and killed, aged 45. His body was disposed of at Strašnice Crematorium. His wife was imprisoned for several months.

After the war, Josef Mašín received a posthumous promotion to brigadier general. His sons - then 13 and 15 years old - got Medals for "personal bravery during the war" from president Edvard Beneš.

References

  Rozhovor s Josefem Mašínem v DVTV

External links
 

1896 births
1942 deaths
People from Kolín District
People from the Kingdom of Bohemia
Czechoslovak generals
Czechoslovak Legion personnel
Czech resistance members
Czech people executed by Nazi Germany
Resistance members killed by Nazi Germany
People executed at Kobylisy shooting range
Recipients of the Milan Rastislav Stefanik Order